The Herveys Range  is a mountain range located in New South Wales, Australia.

The Parkes Radio Telescope, formerly the largest dish in the Southern Hemisphere and featured in the popular Australian movie The Dish, is located right in front of the Hervey Range.

See also
Goobang National Park

Mountain ranges of New South Wales